is a railway station on the Ibusuki Makurazaki Line in Ibusuki, Kagoshima, Japan, operated by Kyushu Railway Company (JR Kyushu). The station is unmanned and opened in 1960.

Lines 
Higashi-Kaimon Station is served by the Ibusuki Makurazaki Line.

Layout
Higashi-Kaimon Station has a single side platform serving bi-directional traffic.

Adjacent stations

History
The station opened on 22 March 1960. With the privatization of Japanese National Railways (JNR) on 1 April 1987, the station came under the control of JR Kyushu.

See also
 List of railway stations in Japan

External links

 JR Kyushu station information 

Ibusuki, Kagoshima
Stations of Kyushu Railway Company
Railway stations in Kagoshima Prefecture
Railway stations in Japan opened in 1960